Emilianos Zacharopoulos (April 12, 1915 in Halki – September 8, 2011 in Athens) was the first Eastern Orthodox metropolitan bishop of Belgium, Netherlands and Luxembourg, since 1969, under jurisdiction of Ecumenical Patriarchate of Constantinople. In 1983, he returned to Greece, became Metropolitan of Kos and retired in 2009.

References

Literature
 

Eastern Orthodox metropolitans
Eastern Orthodoxy in Belgium
Eastern Orthodoxy in the Netherlands
Eastern Orthodoxy in Luxembourg
Bishops of the Ecumenical Patriarchate of Constantinople
Eastern Orthodox bishops in Europe
1915 births
2011 deaths
People from Princes' Islands